Synchiropus signipinnis, the Chesterfield bigeye dragonet, is a species of fish in the family Callionymidae, the dragonets. It is found in the Western Central Pacific.

Etymology
The fishes name is from signum meaning banner and pinnis, meaning fin, referring to high first-dorsal fin of male.

References

signipinnis
Fish of the Pacific Ocean
Taxa named by Ronald Fricke
Fish described in 2000